Annovka is a rural locality (a selo) and the administrative center of Annovsky Selsoviet of Ivanovsky District, Amur Oblast, Russia. The population was 597 as of 2018. There are 9 streets.

Geography 
Annovka is located near the left bank of the Ivanovka River, 28 km east of Ivanovka (the district's administrative centre) by road. Bolsheozyorka is the nearest rural locality.

References 

Rural localities in Ivanovsky District, Amur Oblast